Aureliano, equivalent to Aurelian and Aurelianus, is both a given name and a surname which can refer to:

 Given name
Aureliano Blanquet (1849–1919), general of the Federal Army during the Mexican Civil War
Aureliano Bolognesi (1930–2018), Italian boxer
Aureliano Brandolini (1927–2008), Italian agronomist and development cooperation scholar
Aureliano Cândido Tavares Bastos (1839–1875),  Brazilian politician, writer and journalist
Aureliano Chaves (1929–2003), Brazilian politician
Aureliano de Sousa e Oliveira Coutinho (1800–1855),  Brazilian politician, judge and monarchist
Aureliano de Beruete (1845–1912), Spanish landscape painter, art critic and social activist
Aureliano Fernández-Guerra (1816–1894), Spanish historian, epigrapher and antiquarian
Aureliano Lessa (1828–1861), Brazilian poet
Aureliano Maestre de San Juan (1828–1890), Spanish scientist, histologist, physician and anatomist
Aureliano Milani (1675–1749), Italian painter of the late-Baroque period
Aureliano Pertile (1885–1952), Italian lyric-dramatic tenor
Aureliano Sánchez Arango (1907–1976), Cuban lawyer, politician and university professor
Aureliano Torres (born 1982), Paraguayan football player
Aureliano Urrutia (1871–1975), Mexican physician, and the Minister of Interior

 Surname
Rodolfo Aureliano  (1901–1964), Brazilian philanthropist. One of the first Afro-Brazilians to reach the position of judge of the Law.
Mariano Aureliano  (1925–1988), American author
Tito Aureliano  (born 1989), Brazilian paleontologist.
Waldemar Aureliano De Oliveira Filho (born 1965), retired Brazilian footballer

See also 
 Aureli
Aureliano in Palmira, 1813 operatic dramma serio by Gioachino Rossini